Stenica is a dispersed settlement in the Municipality of Vitanje in northeastern Slovenia. It lies in the hills south and east of Vitanje. Traditionally it was part of the Styria region and is now included in the Savinja Statistical Region.

References

External links
Stenica at Geopedia

Populated places in the Municipality of Vitanje